Bruno Xavier may refer to:

 Bruno Xavier (beach soccer) (born 1984), Brazilian beach soccer defender
 Bruno Xavier (footballer) (born 1996), Brazilian football attacking midfielder